Jasper Johns (born May 15, 1930) is an American painter, sculptor, and printmaker whose work is associated with abstract expressionism, Neo-Dada, and pop art. He is well known for his depictions of the American flag and other US-related topics. Johns's works regularly sell for millions of dollars at sale and auction, including a reported $110 million sale in 2010. At multiple times works by Johns have held the title of most paid for a work by a living artist.

Johns has received many honors throughout his career, including the National Medal of Arts in 1990 and Presidential Medal of Freedom in 2011. He was elected to the American Philosophical Society in 2007. In 2018, The New York Times called him the United States' "foremost living artist."

Life

Born in Augusta, Georgia, Jasper Johns spent his early life in Allendale, South Carolina, with his paternal grandparents after his parents' marriage failed. He then spent a year living with his mother in Columbia, South Carolina, and thereafter, several years living with his Aunt Gladys in Lake Murray, South Carolina, twenty-two miles from Columbia. He spent time with his father Jasper, Sr and stepmother, Geraldine Sineath Johns, who encouraged his art by buying materials for him to draw and paint. He completed Edmunds High School (now Sumter High School) class of 1947 in Sumter, South Carolina, where he once again lived with his mother. Recounting this period in his life, he  said, "In the place where I was a child, there were no artists and there was no art, so I really didn't know what that meant. I think I thought it meant that I would be in a situation different than the one that I was in."

Johns studied a total of three semesters at the University of South Carolina, from 1947 to 1948. He then moved to New York City and studied briefly at the Parsons School of Design in 1949. In 1952 and 1953, he was stationed in Sendai, Japan, during the Korean War.

In 1954, after returning to New York, Johns met Robert Rauschenberg and they became long-term lovers. For a time they lived in the same building as Rachel Rosenthal. During the same period he was strongly influenced by the gay couple Merce Cunningham (a choreographer) and John Cage (a composer). Working together they explored the contemporary art scene, and began developing their ideas on art.

In 1958, gallery owner Leo Castelli discovered Johns while visiting Rauschenberg's studio. “And we went down," Castelli remembered.  "And then I was confronted with that miraculous array of unprecedented images -- flags, red, white and blue... All white... Large ones... small ones, targets... numbers, alphabets. Just an incredible sight ... Something one could not imagine, new and out of the blue." Castelli immediately offered Johns his first solo show. It was here that Alfred Barr, the founding director of New York's Museum of Modern Art, purchased four works from this show. In 1960 he received the Vincent van Volkmer Prize. In 1963, Johns and Cage founded the Foundation for Contemporary Performance Arts, now known as the Foundation for Contemporary Arts in New York City.

Johns currently lives in Sharon, Connecticut, and on the island of Saint Martin. Until 2012, he lived in a rustic 1930s farmhouse with a glass-walled studio in Stony Point, New York. He first began visiting Saint Martin in the late 1960s and bought the property there in 1972. The architect Philip Johnson is the principal designer of his Saint Martin home, a long, white, rectangular structure divided into three distinct sections.

Work

Painting

Johns is best known for his series of flags, maps, targets, letters and numbers, a practice he began in 1954 after burning all his previous artwork. He started introducing text and numbers into his abstract paintings, such as Gray Numbers (1957) and False Start (1959), thus reinstating content. His use of defined or extant symbols differentiated his paintings from the gestural abstraction of the Abstract Expressionists, whose paintings were often understood as expressive of the individual personality or psychology of the artist. Because Johns imported well-known motifs into the fine arts, his paintings could be read as both representational (a flag, a target) and as abstract patterns (stripes, circles). Some art historians and museums characterize his choice of subjects as freeing him from decisions about composition. Johns has remarked: "What’s interesting to me is the fact that it isn’t designed, but taken. It’s not mine,” or, that these motifs are "things the mind already knows."

His encaustic painting Flag (1954–55), which he painted after having a dream of the American flag, marks the beginning of this new period. Flag allowed Johns to create a painting that was not completely abstract because it depicted a symbol (the American flag), yet drew attention to the graphic design of the symbol itself; was not personal because it was a national symbol, and yet, retained a sense of the handmade in the wax brushstrokes; and was not itself a literal flag, yet was not simply a painting. The painting raises a set of complex questions with no clear answers through its combination of symbol and medium. Museum of Modern Art director Alfred H. Barr had to convince the museum trustees to buy the painting, as they were afraid its ambiguity might lead to boycott or attack by patriotic groups. Johns has made over forty variations of American flag paintings.

He also often used plaster reliefs in his paintings (such as Targets with Four Faces, 1955), which challenge typical conceptions of paintings as two-dimensional. Johns often used encaustic as a painting method to create bumpy, textured surfaces unusual in painting. Johns' 2020 work Slice includes a drawing of a knee by Jéan-Marc Togodgue, a Cameroonian emigre student basketball player who attends the Salisbury School near John's estate in Sharon. Johns' use of Togodgue's artwork without first notifying him led to a dispute which was settled amicably.

Sculpture
Johns makes his sculptures in wax first, working the surfaces in a complex pattern of textures, often layering collaged elements such as impressions of newsprint, or of a key, a cast of his friend Merce Cunningham's foot, or one of his own hand. He then casts the waxes in bronze, and, finally, works over the surface again, applying the patina. Flashlight is one of his earliest pedestal-based sculptures. One sculpture, a double-sided relief titled Fragment of a Letter (2009), incorporates part of a letter from Vincent van Gogh to his friend, the artist Émile Bernard. Using blocks of type, Johns pressed the letters of van Gogh's words into the wax. On the other side he spelled out the letter in the American Sign Language alphabet with stamps he made himself. Finally, he signed his name in the wax with his hands in sign language. Numbers (2007) is the largest single bronze Johns has made and depicts his now classic pattern of stenciled numerals repeated in a grid.

Prints
Johns also produces intaglio prints, sculptures and lithographs. Since 1960 Johns has worked closely with Universal Limited Art Editions, Inc (ULAE) in a variety of printmaking techniques to investigate and develop existing compositions. Initially, lithography suited Johns and enabled him to create print versions of iconic depictions of flags, maps, and targets that filled his paintings. In 1971, Johns became the first artist at ULAE to use the handfed offset lithographic press, resulting in Decoy — an image realized in printmaking before it was made in drawing or painting. However, apart from the Lead Reliefs series of 1969, he has concentrated his efforts on lithography at Gemini G.E.L. In 1976, Johns partnered with writer Samuel Beckett to create Foirades/Fizzles; the book includes 33 etchings, which revisit an earlier work by Johns and five text fragments by Beckett. He has also worked with Atelier Crommelynck in Paris, in association with Petersburg Press of London and New York; and Simca Print Artists in New York. In 2000, Johns produced a limited-edition linocut for the Grenfell Press.

In 1973, Johns produced a print called Cup 2 Picasso, for XXe siècle, a French publication. For the May 2014 issue of Art in America, he created a black-and-white lithograph depicting many of his signature motifs, including numbers, a map of the United States and sign language.

Collaborations
For decades Johns worked with others to raise both funds and attention for Merce Cunningham's choreography. He privately assisted Robert Rauschenberg in some of his 1950s designs for Cunningham. In spring 1963, Johns helped start the Foundation for Contemporary Performance Arts, then intended to sponsor and raise funds in the performance field; the other founders were John Cage, Elaine de Kooning, the designer David Hayes, and the theater producer Lewis B. Lloyd. Johns later was the Merce Cunningham Dance Company's artistic adviser from 1967 to 1980. In 1968 Johns and Cunningham made a Duchamp-inspired theater piece, Walkaround Time, in which Johns's décor replicates elements of Duchamp's work The Large Glass (1915–23). Earlier, Johns also wrote neodada lyrics for The Druds, a short-lived avant-garde noise music art band that featured prominent members of the New York proto-conceptual art and minimal art community. Johns himself was a subject of a painting when Chuck Close painted him in one of his large scale portraits in 1998.

Commissions
In 1964, architect Philip Johnson, a friend, commissioned Johns to make a piece for what is now the David H. Koch Theater at Lincoln Center. After presiding over the theatre's lobby for 35 years, Numbers (1964), an enormous 9-foot-by-7-foot grid of numerals, was supposed to be sold by the center for a reported $15 million. Art historians consider Numbers a historically important work in part because it is the largest of the artist's numbers motifs and the only one where each unit is on a separate stretcher, fashioned from a material called Sculpmetal, which was chosen by the artist for its durability. Responding to widespread criticism, the board of Lincoln Center had to drop its selling plans.

Style 
Johns's work is sometimes grouped in with Neo-Dadaist and pop art: he uses symbols in the Dada tradition of the readymades of Marcel Duchamp, but unlike many Pop artists like Andy Warhol, he does not engage with celebrity culture. Other scholars and museums position Johns and Rauschenberg as predecessors of Pop Art.

Valuation
In 1998, the Metropolitan Museum of Art in New York bought Johns's White Flag. While the Museum would not disclose how much was paid, The New York Times reported that "experts estimate [the painting's] value at more than $20 million". The National Gallery of Art acquired about 1,700 of Johns's proofs in 2007. This made the gallery home to the largest number of Johns's works held by a single institution. The exhibition showed works from many points in Johns's career, including recent proofs of his prints. The Greenville County Museum of Art in Greenville, South Carolina, has several of his pieces in their permanent collection.

Johns was elected a Fellow of the American Academy of Arts and Sciences in 1984. In 1990, he was awarded the National Medal of Arts. On February 15, 2011, he received the Presidential Medal of Freedom from President Barack Obama, becoming the first painter or sculptor to receive a Presidential Medal of Freedom since Alexander Calder in 1977. In 1990 he was elected into the National Academy of Design as an Associate member and became a full Academician in 1994. In 1994 he was awarded the Edward MacDowell Medal.

His text Statement (1959) has been published in Theories and Documents of Contemporary Art: A Sourcebook of Artists' Writings.

Since the 1980s, Johns typically produces only four to five paintings a year; some years he produces none. His large-scale paintings are much favored by collectors and because of their rarity are extremely difficult to acquire. His works from the mid to late 1950s, typically viewed as his period of rebellion against abstract expressionism, remain his most sought after. Skate's Art Market Research (Skate Press, Ltd.), a New York-based advisory firm servicing private and institutional investors in the art market, has ranked Jasper Johns as the 30th most valuable artist in the world. The firm's index of the 1,000 most valuable works of art sold at auction—Skate's Top 1000—contains 7 works by Johns.

In 1980 the Whitney Museum of American Art paid $1 million for Three Flags (1958), then the highest price ever paid for the work of a living artist. In 1988, Johns's False Start was sold at auction at Sotheby's to Samuel I. Newhouse, Jr., for $17.05 million, setting a record at the time as the highest price paid for a work by a living artist at auction, and the second highest price paid for an artwork at auction in the U.S. In 2006, private collectors Anne and Kenneth Griffin (founder of the Chicago-based hedge fund Citadel LLC) bought False Start (1959) from David Geffen for $80 million, making it the most expensive painting by a living artist. On November 11, 2014, a 1983 version of Flag was auctioned at Sotheby's in New York for $36 million, establishing a new auction record for Johns.

In 2010, Flag (1958), one of a series, was sold privately to hedge fund billionaire Steven A. Cohen for a reported $110 million (then £73 million; €81.7 million). The seller was Jean-Christophe Castelli, son of Leo Castelli, Johns's legendary dealer, who had died in 1999. While the price was not disclosed by the parties, art experts say Cohen paid about $110 million. "Flags" are Johns's most famous works. The artist painted his first American flag in 1954–1955, a work now at the MoMA.

Selected work

 Flag (1954–1955)
 White Flag (1955)
 Target with Plaster Casts (1955)
 Tango (1955)
 Target with Four Faces (1955)
 Numbers in Color (1958–1959)
 Device circle (1959)
 False Start (1959)
 Three Flags (1958)
 Coat Hanger (1960)
 Painting With Two Balls (1960)
 Painted Bronze (1960)
 Target (1961)
 Painting With Ruler (1961)
 Painting Bitten by a Man (1961)
 The Critic Sees (1961)
 Study for Skin (1962)
 Diver (1962)
 Device (1961-1962)
 Map (1963)
 Periscope (Hart Crane) (1963)
 Figure Five (1963–1964)
 Voice (1966-1967)
 Walkaround Time (1968)
 Untitled (Skull) (1973)
 Titanic (1976–1978)
 Tantric Detail (1980)
 Usuyuki (1981)
 Perilous Night (1982)
 The Seasons (1986)
 Green Angel (1990)
  After Hans Holbein (1993)
  Bridge (1997)
 Regrets (2013)
 Slice (2020)

In popular culture
In "Mom and Pop Art", a 1999 episode of the animated television series The Simpsons, Johns guest stars as himself. He is depicted as a thief who steals whatever he can get his hands on.

References
Notes

Bibliography
Busch, Julia M., A Decade of Sculpture: the New Media in the 1960s  (The Art Alliance Press: Philadelphia; Associated University Presses: London, 1974) 

Further reading

 Bernstein, Roberta. Jasper Johns' Paintings and Sculptures, 1954–1974: "The Changing Focus of the Eye.". Ann Arbor: UMI Research Press, 1985.
 Bernstein, Roberta; Tone, Lilian; Johns, Jasper and Varnedoe, Kirk. Jasper Johns: A Retrospective, The Museum of Modern Art, 2006.
 Castleman, Riva. Jasper Johns: A Print Retrospective. The Museum of Modern Art 1986.
 Crichton, Michael. Jasper Johns, Whitney/Abrams, 1977 (out of print).
 Hess, Barbara. Jasper Johns. The Business of the Eye. Taschen, Köln 2007.
 Johns, Jasper; Varnedoe, Kirk; Hollevoet, Christel; and Frank, Robert. Jasper Johns: Writings, Sketchbook Notes, Interviews,  The Museum of Modern Art, 2002 (out of print).
 Kozloff, Max. Jasper Johns, Abrams, 1972. (out of print)
 Krauss, Rosalind E. and Knight, Christopher. "Split decisions: Jasper Johns in retrospect" Artforum, September 1996. Findarticles.com
 Kuspit, Donald (2010). "Jasper Johns: The Graying of Modernism". Psychodrama: Modern Art as Group Therapy. London: Ziggurat. pp. 417–425. .
 Orton, Fred. Figuring Jasper Johns, Reaktion Books, 1994.
 Pearlman, Debra. Where Is Jasper Johns? (Adventures in Art), Prestel Publishing, 2006.
 Rosenberg, Harold. "Jasper Johns: Things the Mind Already Knows". Vogue, 1964.
 Shapiro, David. Jasper Johns Drawings 1954–1984. Abrams 1984 (out of print).
 Steinberg, Leo. Jasper Johns. New York: George Wittenborn, 1963.
 Tomkins, Calvin. Off the Wall: Robert Rauschenberg and the Artworld of our time.  Doubleday. 1980.
 Weiss, Jeffrey. Jasper Johns: An Allegory of Painting, 1955–1965, Yale University Press, 2007.
 Yau, John. A Thing Among Things: The Art of Jasper Johns, D.A.P./Distributed Art Publishers, 2008.

External links

Jasper Johns: An Allegory of Painting, 1955–1965, an exhibition at the US National Gallery of Art, Washington, DC
States and Variations: Prints by Jasper Johns, an exhibition at the US National Gallery of Art
Jasper Johns (born 1930) Timeline of Art History | The Metropolitan Museum of Art

Jasper Johns bio at artchive.com
PBS Jasper Johns 2008
Powers Art Center - A Showcase of Jasper Johns's Works on Paper
Jasper Johns's Three Flags at Art Beyond Sight (Art Education for the Blind)
Review of the Whitney and the Philadelphia museums' 2021 shows at Artnet News, 	October 12, 2021
The Formulaic Juxtapositions of Jasper Johns's 'Mind/Mirror', at Frieze, November 12, 2021

1930 births
Living people
People from Augusta, Georgia
People from Allendale, South Carolina
20th-century American painters
American male painters
21st-century American painters
21st-century American male artists
American pop artists
Artists from New York (state)
Artists from South Carolina
University of South Carolina alumni
Fellows of the American Academy of Arts and Sciences
American gay artists
American LGBT painters
Gay painters
Members of the American Academy of Arts and Letters
National Academy of Design members
Parsons School of Design alumni
Postmodern artists
Recipients of the Praemium Imperiale
United States National Medal of Arts recipients
Wolf Prize in Arts laureates
People from Stony Point, New York
20th-century American printmakers
Presidential Medal of Freedom recipients
Honorary Members of the Royal Academy
Painters from Georgia (U.S. state)
20th-century American male artists
Members of the Royal Swedish Academy of Arts
20th-century American LGBT people
21st-century American LGBT people